Shirbourne is a rural locality in the Shire of Burdekin, Queensland, Australia. In the  Shirbourne had a population of 76 people.

History 
Shirbourne State School opened on 17 August 1931 and closed on 7 August 1970.

In the  Shirbourne had a population of 76 people.

References 

Shire of Burdekin
Localities in Queensland